Avidesh Samaroo (born 22 January 1978) is a Trinidadian cricketer. He played in twelve first-class matches for Trinidad and Tobago from 1995 to 2000.

See also
 List of Trinidadian representative cricketers

References

External links
 

1978 births
Living people
Trinidad and Tobago cricketers